"Steppin' Out" is a song by English musician Joe Jackson, originally included on his 1982 album Night and Day. The song, inspired by Jackson's time in New York City, was his highest-charting single in America, where it peaked at number 6 on the Billboard Hot 100. It reached the same position in Jackson's native UK.

Background
The song is about the anticipation and excitement of a drive out around the town. Released as a single in early August 1982, it became Jackson's biggest hit in the United States, peaking at No. 5 in Cashbox magazine and No. 6 on the Billboard Hot 100 chart.

It also reached No. 4 on Billboards Hot Adult Contemporary Tracks chart and No. 7 on Billboards Album Rock Tracks. The infectious tune was Jackson's second biggest hit on the UK Singles Chart, where it reached No. 6 in December 1982. Only "It's Different for Girls", which reached No. 5 in the UK in 1980, did better.

During his 2019 tour for the album Fool, Jackson stated he played all the instruments on "Steppin' Out", with the exception of a drummer, who did nothing but mimic the snare drum. The rest of the drumming was done by a Korg KR 55 drum machine, the original of which Jackson used on the 2019 tour to play the song.

Music video
The music video for the song, directed by Steve Barron, featured a blonde, attractive hotel maid fantasising that she is a Cinderella figure. It was filmed over one night in the St. Regis Hotel in New York City during the summer of 1982.  The video used the shorter single version instead of the full album version.

Accolades
"Steppin' Out" earned Grammy nominations for Record of the Year and Best Pop Vocal Performance, Male.

Reception
AllMusic journalist Chris True praised the song as a "mélange of simple piano hooks, rudimentary electronic treatment and classic vocal pop, with a rhythm track that is quaint in its simplicity and driving enough to invoke images of the big city at night."

In 2015, Pitchfork Media placed "Steppin' Out" at 153 on its list of "The 200 Greatest Songs of the 1980s." Glide Magazine ranked it as Jackson's 2nd best song.

Chart history

Weekly charts

Year-end charts

References

1982 songs
1982 singles
A&M Records singles
Joe Jackson (musician) songs
Music videos directed by Steve Barron
Song recordings produced by David Kershenbaum
Songs about New York City
Songs written by Joe Jackson (musician)